The French submarine Rubis (H4, 202, P15) was a  minelaying submarine which first served  in the French submarine pavilion, then the Free French Naval Forces (FNFL) during the Second World War and back with the French Navy. The boat was awarded numerous awards. Accordingly, as a result of Rubiss service with the FNFL, the boat was made a companion of the Ordre de la Libération by a decree issued by General Charles de Gaulle on 14 October 1941.

Career 
After serving in Toulon with the 7th and later 5th Submarine Squadrons, in 1937 Rubis was transferred to Cherbourg.

During the Norwegian campaign, in May 1940, Rubis laid mines off the Norwegian coast; the boat's mines claimed four Norwegian vessels in May and June, and a further three merchant ships in July. At the time of the French surrender on 22 June 1940, the boat was in the port of Dundee, Scotland in the United Kingdom, where the boat promptly joined the pavilion of the Free French Forces. At that time, she was commanded by Capitaine de Corvette Georges Cabanier.

Whilst minelaying off Norway in mid-1941, Rubis encountered and torpedoed a Finnish merchant ship. Later in the war, the boat laid mines in the Bay of Biscay, claiming three German auxiliary minesweepers, an armed trawler, and a Vichy French tugboat in 1942, and a fourth auxiliary minesweeper in 1943. Operating off Stavanger in September 1944, the boat's mines claimed two auxiliary submarine chasers and two merchant ships. In October and November, Rubis continued in Norwegian waters, damaging but not sinking two vessels. On 21 December, the boat's mines claimed three auxiliary submarine chasers, a German merchant ship, and a minesweeper.

Throughout the war, Rubis made 22 operational patrols, laying nearly 683 mines and sinking some 21,000 GRT of shipping. With 22 ships sunk (14 of them German, including 12 warships), Rubis achieved the highest kill number in the FNFL.

From 1946 to 1948, she was used as a school ship for rigging in Toulon.

Rubis was struck on 4 October 1949, and was sunk on 31 January 1958 to be used as a sonar target. The wreck lies  underwater between Cavalaire and Saint-Tropez, and has become a popular diving attraction.

Ships sunk or damaged

1940 
26 May 1940: Norwegian transport Vansø (54 BRT) hits a mine laid on 10 May and sinks at 
28 May 1940: Norwegian sail ship Blaamannen (174 BRT), from Haugesund, hits a mine laid on 27 May and sinks at 
31 May 1940: Norwegian merchant ship Jadarland (938 BRT), from Haugesund, hits a mine laid on 27 May and sinks at 
10 June 1940: Norwegian merchant ship Sverre Sigurdssøn (1,081 BRT) hits a mine laid on 9 June off Herdla and sinks at 
The ship survives.

1941 

1942 

1943 

1944 
27 September 1944: 
 German auxiliary submarine hunter UJ 1715 (formerly Lesum), 464 BRT, hits a mine laid on 24 September and sinks at 
 German merchant ship  (5,295 BRT) hits a mine laid on 24 September and sinks at 
 Norwegian cargo ship Knute Nelson (5,749 BRT) hits a mine laid on 24 September and sinks at 
The ship survives with heavy damage.
24 November 1944: Norwegian merchant ship Castor (1,683 BRT), from Egersund, hits a mine laid on the same day and sustain damage.
21 December 1944, off Norway:
 German cargo ship  (formerly Latvian Gundega), 3,654 BRT, hits a mine laid on 19 December and sinks
 German auxiliary submarine hunter UJ 1113 / KUJ 7, 970 BRT, hits a mine laid on 19 December and sinks
 German auxiliary submarine hunter UJ 1116 / KUJ 11, 970 BRT, hits a mine laid on 19 December and sinks
 German auxiliary submarine hunter UJ 1702 / KUJ 16, 970 BRT, hits a mine laid on 19 December and sinks
 German minesweeper R 402, 140 t, hits a mine laid on 19 December and sinks

See also 
List of submarines of France

References

External links
FS Rubis, uboat.net
Les bâtiments ayant porté le nom de Rubis
File on Rubis on the Ordre de la Libération website
  Wreck of Rubis
  Panorama of the wreck of Rubis 

Saphir-class submarines (1928)
Ships built in France
1931 ships
World War II submarines of France
Submarines of the Free French Naval Forces
Companions of the Liberation